Blanco High School is a public high school located in Blanco, Texas (USA) and classified as a 3A school by the UIL. It is part of the Blanco Independent School District that serves students in southern Blanco County. In 2015, the school was rated "Met Standard" by the Texas Education Agency.

Athletics
The Blanco Panthers compete in the following sports 

Baseball
Basketball
Cross Country
Football
Golf
Powerlifting
Softball
Tennis
Track and Field
Volleyball

State Titles
Football 
2001(2A/D1)

Notable alumni
Willie Upshaw - former Major League Baseball player and coach

References

External links
Blanco ISD

Public high schools in Texas
Schools in Blanco County, Texas